Jozefína Čerchlanová (born 29 March 1952) is a Slovak middle-distance runner. She competed in the women's 800 metres at the 1976 Summer Olympics, representing Czechoslovakia.

References

1952 births
Living people
Athletes (track and field) at the 1976 Summer Olympics
Slovak female middle-distance runners
Olympic athletes of Czechoslovakia
Place of birth missing (living people)
Universiade silver medalists for Czechoslovakia
Universiade medalists in athletics (track and field)
Competitors at the 1973 Summer Universiade
Competitors at the 1977 Summer Universiade
Medalists at the 1975 Summer Universiade